Arthur Parker may refer to:

 Arthur C. Parker (1881–1955), archaeologist
 Arthur Jeph Parker (1923–2002), set decorator
 Arthur Parker (footballer) (1878–?), English footballer
 Arthur L. Parker (1885–1945), American businessman and inventor